This is a list of areas in the Metropolitan Borough of Walsall, West Midlands, England.

 Aldridge
 Ashmore Lake
 Barr Common
 Bentley
 Bentley West
 Bescot
 Birchills
 Blakenall Heath
 Bloxwich
 Brownhills
 Brownhills Common
 Brownhills West
 Butcroft
 Caldmore
 Catshill
 Chuckery
 Clayhanger
 Coal Pool
 County Bridge
 Daisy Bank
 Darlaston
 Darlaston Green
 Daw End
 The Delves
 Druid's Heath
 Dudley's Fields
 Fallings Heath
 Fishley
 Fullbrook
 Gillity Village
 Goscote
 Harden
 Hardwick
 Heath End
 Highbridge
 Highgate
 High Heath
 Holly Bank
 Keyway
 King's Hill
 Lane Head
 Leamore
 Leighswood
 Little Bloxwich
 Little London
 Moxley
 New Invention
 New Town
 Old Moxley
 Paddock
 Palfrey
 Park Hall
 Pelsall
 Pelsall Wood
 Pheasey
 Pleck
 Pool Green
 Pool Hayes
 Reedswood
 Rough Hay
 Rushall
 Ryecroft
 Shelfield
 Shepwell Green
 Shire Oak
 Short Heath
 Spring Bank
 Streetly
 Stubbers Green
 Tamebridge 
 Vigo
 Wallington Heath
 Walsall
 Walsall Wood
 Willenhall
 Woods Bank

Lists of places in England
Areas
Towns in the West Midlands (county)
West Midlands (county)-related lists